Brian Campfield is a trade unionist from Northern Ireland.

Campfield began working for the Northern Ireland Public Service Alliance (NIPSA) in 1978.  During the 1980s, he was the Communist Party of Ireland's officer with responsibility for Northern Ireland, and in 1989 he and Michael O'Riordan visited East Germany to take part in celebrations of the country's fortieth anniversary, shortly before the fall of the Berlin Wall.  Around that time, he was elected as President of Belfast Trades Union Council, serving until the 2010s.

In the 2000s, Campfield became Deputy General Secretary of NIPSA, and in 2009 he won election to the Irish Congress of Trade Unions'  (ICTU) Executive Council.  He became General Secretary of NIPSA in 2010, defeating Kieran Bannon in the election, remaining in post until his retirement in 2015.  That year, he became President of ICTU for a two-year term.

References

Year of birth missing (living people)
Living people
Irish communists
Presidents of the Irish Congress of Trade Unions
Place of birth missing (living people)